Ewan Fernie is a British scholar and writer. He is professor, fellow and chair of Shakespeare Studies at the Shakespeare Institute, University of Birmingham. He is also director of the pioneering 'Everything to Everybody' Project, a collaboration between the University of Birmingham and Birmingham City Council.

Background and career

Fernie won the James Elliott prize for his 1994 first-class degree from the University of Edinburgh, where he was also awarded a medal in aesthetics, the Horsliehill-Scott Bursary in Philosophy and a number of other prizes. He took his PhD from the University of St Andrews and afterwards lectured at the Queen's University of Belfast and Royal Holloway before joining the Shakespeare Institute in 2011. Shortly after taking up his chair at the Shakespeare Institute, Fernie pioneered the Shakespeare and Creativity MA programme. In 2005, he was named one of the world's six best Renaissance scholars under 40.

Fernie believes in the politics of culture, as evinced by his Redcrosse project promoting a civic liturgy for St George's Day and his advocacy of Shakespeare as European Laureate. He is centrally involved in the University of Birmingham's five-year collaboration with the Royal Shakespeare Company at its newly reopened studio theatre, The Other Place. He also has a developing interest in the way in which an enthusiasm for Shakespeare played into the radical reformation of industrial Birmingham; and he has been a keen campaigner to save the Library of Birmingham from impending cuts.

Fernie travels worldwide giving lectures at various educational institutions and events. He has been a visiting scholar at Eton College, and an International Fellow at the Centre for Advanced Studies, LMU, Munich; he has presented his work at the University of Verona, the Sorbonne, University College Dublin, the Australasian Universities Language and Literature Association, the World Shakespeare Congress, the Shakespeare Association of America, Shakespeare's Globe, the Rose Theatre, etc. Fernie was a visiting professor at the ARC Centre of Excellence for the History of Emotions in Australia in April 2015. In 2017, he gave a keynote at the Swiss Association of University Teachers of English meeting in Neuchâtel and was a Lloyd Davis Memorial Visiting Professor at the University of Queensland. He addressed the Société Française Shakespeare in Paris in 2018.

Engagements in 2019 include addressing the Shakespeare Association of America in Washington, D.C., participation in a ‘Citizen Shakespeare’ Symposium at the University of Minnesota and a key-note address at Charles University in Prague.

Work

Fernie's critical work is characterised by passionate intellectual engagement and the belief that art and literature can really connect with and even shape personal, political and religious life. His main area of specialism is Shakespeare but his interests extend to European writers and philosophers, among them Dostoevsky, Hegel, Mann, Nietzsche, Luther and others, as evidenced in his critically acclaimed The Demonic: Literature and Experience (2012). He is also the author of Shame in Shakespeare and editor of Spiritual Shakespeares. With Simon Palfrey, he is editor of the Arden Shakespeare Now! series of minigraphs on various urgent topics in contemporary Shakespeare studies.

Fernie believes in experimenting with and testing the possibilities of critical form. As a creative writer, he has written a novel called Macbeth, Macbeth with Simon Palfrey, which is based on Shakespeare's Macbeth and inspired by Dostoevsky's The Brothers Karamazov and was published in 2016. He was Principal Investigator of 'The Faerie Queene Now: Remaking Religious Poetry for Today's World' and leader of 'The Faerie Queene Liturgy Project', the major outcome of which was the Redcrosse liturgy for contemporary England. This was performed in major cathedrals, attracted a BNP protest, and was published by Bloomsbury, before being adopted by the Royal Shakespeare Company. The project was initially funded by AHRC/ESRC and was further supported by Arts Council, LCACE, Awards for All, the PRS Foundation for Music and the Church Urban Fund. Fernie has also written poetry for the acclaimed Ex Cathedra choir's Candlelight concerts in Birmingham, London and other places.

Fernie's recent work includes a volume on Thomas Mann and Shakespeare edited with Tobias Döring, and a new play called Marina, based on Shakespeare's Pericles and written with Katharine Craik. Fernie's latest authored book is Shakespeare for Freedom: Why the Plays Matter, published by CUP in 2017. He has recently published New Places: Shakespeare and Civic Creativity, co-edited with Paul Edmondson of the Shakespeare Birthplace Trust.

Fernie also contributed to the British Council's project 'Shakespeare Lives' in celebration of the 400th anniversary of Shakespeare's death in 2016 where he addressed large audiences especially in Belgrade and Budapest. His major current project is an ambitious collaboration with Birmingham City Council. The 'Everything to Everybody' Project aims to use Birmingham's forgotten past to inspire our future and to unlock the world's first people's Shakespeare Library for all. Its patron is the renowned Birmingham-born-and-bred actor, Adrian Lester.

Publications

 (as co-editor with Paul Edmondson) New Places: Shakespeare and Civic Creativity, The Arden Shakespeare, (2018), 
 Shakespeare for Freedom: Why the Plays Matter, Cambridge University Press, (2017),  
 ‘Introduction’, The Poet's Quest for God: 21st Century Poems of Faith, Doubt and Wonder, ed. Todd Swift et al., Eyewear Publishing, (2016), 
 (as co-author with Simon Palfrey) Macbeth, Macbeth, Bloomsbury, (2016),  
 (as co-editor with Tobias Döring) Thomas Mann and Shakespeare: Something Rich and Strange, Bloomsbury, (2015), 
 ‘Freetown! Shakespeare and Social Flourishing’, Shakespeare Survey 68 (2015),  
 ‘Love's Transgression’, in The Circulation of Knowledge in Early Modern English Literature, ed. Sophie Chiari, Ashgate, (2015), 
 ‘Another Golgotha’, in Shakespeare and Varieties of Early Modern Religious Belief, ed. David Loewenstein and Michael Witmore, CUP, (2014),  
 ‘Afterword’, Revisiting The Tempest, ed. Silvia Bigliazzi and Lisanna Calvi, Palgrave, (2014), 
 ‘Redcrosse: Storytelling, Religion and Nation in England’, in Storytelling: Critical and Creative Approaches, ed. L. E. Semler, Philippa Kelly, and Jan Shaw, Palgrave, (2014), 
 The Demonic: Literature and Experience, Routledge, (2012), 
 Shame in Shakespeare, Routledge, (2002), 
 ‘Wisdom in Reverse’, in The Oxford Handbook of Thomas Middleton, ed. Gary Taylor and Trish Thomas Henley, Oxford University Press, (2011),  
 (with Simon Palfrey) 'Major Excerpt from Dunsinane', in Crrritic, ed. John Schad and Oliver Tearle, Sussex Academic Press, (2011), 
  'Mea Culpa: Measure for Measure and Complicity’, in Shakespeare and I, ed. Will McKenzie and Theodora Papadopoulou, Continuum, (2011), 
 ‘Dollimore's Challenge’, Shakespeare Studies (2007), 
 ‘Hard-core Tragedy’, in Transhistorical Tragedy, ed. Sarah Annes Brown and Catherine Silverstone, Blackwell, (2007), 
 ‘Action! Henry V', in Presentist Shakespeares, ed. Hugh Grady and Terence Hawkes, Routledge, (2007),  
 'Terrible Action: Recent Criticism and Questions of Agency’, Shakespeare 2 (2006), ISSN 1745-0918 (Print), ISSN 1745-0926 (Online)
 Shakespeare and the Prospect of Presentism’, Shakespeare Survey 58 (2005), 
 (as Editor and Co-Author) Redcrosse: Remaking Religious Poetry for Today's World, Bloomsbury, (2012), 
 (as Editor) Spiritual Shakespeares, Routledge, (2005),   
 (as Co-ordinating Editor) Reconceiving the Renaissance: A Critical Reader, Oxford University Press, (2006), 

(as General Editor, with Simon Palfrey) The Shakespeare Now! series (Arden, Bloomsbury):

 Shakespeare's Universality: Here's Fine Revolution, by Kiernan Ryan (2015)
 Tragic Cognition in Shakespeare's Othello: Beyond the Neural Sublime, by Paul Ceflau (2015)
 The King and I, by Philippa Kelly (2015)
 Nine Lives of William Shakespeare, by Graham Holderness (2013)
 Hamlet's Dreams, by David Schalkwyk (2013)
 Shakespeare and I, by William McKenzie and Theodora Papadopoulou (ed.) (2012)
 The Life in the Sonnets, by David Fuller (2011)
 At the Bottom of Shakespeare's Ocean, by Steve Mentz (2009)
 Shakespearean Metaphysics, by Michael Witmore (2008)
 Shakespeare's Modern Collaborators, by Lukas Erne (2008)
 Shakespeare's Double Helix, by Henry S. Turner (2008)
 Shakespeare Thinking, by Philip Davis (2007)
 Shakespeare Inside: The Bard Behind Bars, by Amy Scott-Douglass (2007)
 Godless Shakespeare, by Eric Mallin (2007)
 To Be or Not to Be, by Douglas Bruster (2007)

References

British literary critics
Academics of the University of Birmingham
Year of birth missing (living people)
Living people
Alumni of the University of Edinburgh
Alumni of the University of St Andrews
Place of birth missing (living people)